Berekum East  is one of the constituencies represented in the Parliament of Ghana. It elects one Member of Parliament (MP) by the first past the post system of election. Brekum East is found in the Bono Region of Ghana.

The member of parliament for this constituency is Nelson Kyeremeh.

References 

Parliamentary constituencies in the Bono Region
Bono Region
Districts of Bono Region